The 2012–13 Belarusian Cup was contested by 10 teams, divided into two groups. The top team from each group qualified for the final, where HK Gomel defeated Metallurg Zhlobin to win the cup. The tournament took place from August 13 to September 1, 2012.

First round

Group I

Group II

Final
Metallurg Zhlobin - HK Gomel 2:3 (0:1, 2:2, 0:0)

External links
Tournament on hockeyarchives.info

Bel